2013 Italian Athletics Indoor Championships was the 44th edition of the Italian Athletics Indoor Championships and were held in Ancona.

Records
In this edition of the championships have fallen three national records: Michael Tumi (6.51 in male 60 metres), Silvano Chesani (2.33 m in male high jump) and the junior Roberta Bruni (4.60 m in female pole vault).

Champions

See also
2013 Italian Athletics Championships

References

External links
 All results at FIDAL web site

Italian Athletics Championships
Athletics
Italian Athletics Indoor Championships
International athletics competitions hosted by Italy